BBC Radio Guernsey is the BBC's local radio station serving the Bailiwick of Guernsey.

It broadcasts on FM, AM, DAB, digital TV and via BBC Sounds from studios on Bulwer Avenue in St Sampson.

According to RAJAR, the station has a weekly audience of 18,000 listeners and a 13.5% share as of December 2022.

Overview
BBC Radio Guernsey has grown from a small part-time radio operation in the early 1980s into a full tri-media broadcaster, providing locally produced radio, online and TV services. Each week, the station broadcasts 40 hours of local programming ranging from news and current affairs to music and conversation.

Like other BBC enterprises in Guernsey, funding comes primarily from television licence fees collected in Guernsey itself.

In recent years, local output has been reduced to eight hours on weekdays, coinciding with an increase in regional programming shared with sister station BBC Radio Jersey.

In addition to its FM and AM frequencies, the station also broadcasts on Freeview TV channel 721 and streams online via BBC Sounds and BBC Radio Guernsey Online. Transmissions on digital radio began on 1 August 2021 with the launch of the Channel Islands DAB multiplex, on which BBC Radio Jersey also broadcasts, alongside BBC Radio Guernsey Xtra, a part-time stream carrying the station's AM opt-out content (chiefly parliamentary coverage), and a similar opt-out for Radio Jersey. The stations are the first BBC stations to use the DAB+ standard – at the time of launch, all stations on the BBC National DAB multiplex, and all other BBC Local Radio stations on the UK mainland, used the earlier DAB format.

Programming

Local programming is produced and broadcast from the BBC's St Sampson's studios from 6am – 2pm on weekdays

Regional programming for the Channel Islands, shared with BBC Radio Jersey, airs from 2-10pm on weekdays, from 6am – 6pm and 8-10pm on Saturdays and from 6am – 6pm on Sundays.

Off-peak programming originates from BBC Radio Devon in Plymouth, BBC Radio Cornwall in Truro and BBC Radio Solent in Southampton.

During the station's downtime, BBC Radio Guernsey simulcasts overnight programming from BBC Radio 5 Live and BBC Radio London

See also
 BBC Radio Jersey

References and external links

External links
 BBC Radio Guernsey
 Listen live to BBC Radio Guernsey
 Programme schedule
 Media UK – BBC Radio Guernsey

Guernsey
Radio stations in Guernsey